Carcassonne: Wheel of Fortune 2009 is a tile-based German-style board game developed by Klaus-Jürgen Wrede and distributed by Hans im Glück in German and Rio Grande Games in English.  It is considered a game in the Carcassonne series, and is considered both as a standalone game as well as an expansion set to Carcassonne.

Gameplay 

As Wheel of Fortune is a "standalone expansion" of Carcassonne, Wheel of Fortune plays identically to Carcassonne.  Wheel of Fortune includes all of the tiles, except the starting tile, present in Carcassonne, as well as the tiles from all expansions that do not involve any new mechanics (primarily from Carcassonne: Inns and Cathedrals, Carcassonne: Traders and Builders, and Carcassonne: King and Scout).  However, certain tiles have additional markings significant to this expansion.

The new feature of Wheel of Fortune is the namesake wheel, which takes the place of the starting tile.  The wheel consists of a number of spaces, and players, in place of placing followers on the tile they just played, may place tiles on spaces along the rim of the wheel.  Each space on the wheel may have one or two spaces on the rim.  In addition, a pig-shaped marker begins on the wheel, and is moved whenever a tiles with certain markings are drawn.  When these tiles are drawn, the marker is advanced clockwise along the wheel the number of spaces stated on the tile.  The space on the wheel is resolved, and followers on the rim of the particular space are scored, before the tile is placed.  Wheel effects include scoring by all players for certain types of followers (including unplayed followers), scoring by only the player on move, or the removal of a follower on the board (except on the wheel) by all players.  Followers on the wheel score three points, except when there is only one follower on a wheel space that has two spaces on the rim, in which the follower scores six points.  Followers on the wheel at the end of the game are not worth any points.  Once scored, followers on the wheel are returned to their owners.

Wheel of Fortune is fully compatible with Carcassonne and its expansions - when combined with Carcassonne, only one set of player pieces (provided with both games) is used.  Wheel of Fortune tiles are differentiated from Carcassonne tiles with a distinct logo on every tile, as with all other Carcassonne expansions.

Carcassonne: Wheel of Fortune was also packaged and released as part of Carcassonne Big Box 5 in 2014. Also included in the set were the Carcassonne expansions Inns & Cathedrals, Traders & Bulders, Hills & Sheep, and The River.

External links 
Carcassonne: Wheel of Fortune at Rio Grande Games

Carcassonne (board game)
Board games introduced in 2009